Sara José López Bueno (born 24 April 1995), is a Colombian athlete who competes in compound archery. She first competed for the Colombian national team in 2011 Pre-Olympic event in Medellin, Colombia. She won medals at several editions of the World Games.

At the FITA Archery World Cup in 2013, she qualified for the final. She rose to her highest world ranking of 3 in 2013, and her major achievements include winning the 2014 Archery World Cup. As well as competing internationally in archery, she is a medical student.

López is the current world record holder for a 15-arrow round and other 10 world records, having become the first woman to shoot a perfect 150 at stage 3 of the World Cup in Medellin.

In 2020, she won the inaugural Lockdown Knockout tournament organised by World Archery. In the final she defeated Anders Faugstad of Norway.

She won the 2021 Athlete of the Year award by World Archery Americas in the compound women category.

She won the silver medal in the women's compound event at the 2022 World Games held in Birmingham, Alabama, United States. López and Daniel Muñoz won the gold medal in the mixed team compound event.

References

External links
 

1995 births
Living people
Colombian female archers
World Archery Championships medalists
Competitors at the 2013 World Games
Competitors at the 2017 World Games
Competitors at the 2022 World Games
World Games gold medalists
World Games silver medalists
World Games bronze medalists
World Games medalists in archery
South American Games gold medalists for Colombia
Central American and Caribbean Games gold medalists for Colombia
Central American and Caribbean Games silver medalists for Colombia
South American Games medalists in archery
Competitors at the 2018 South American Games
Competitors at the 2022 South American Games
Competitors at the 2014 Central American and Caribbean Games
Competitors at the 2018 Central American and Caribbean Games
Archers at the 2019 Pan American Games
Pan American Games gold medalists for Colombia
Pan American Games bronze medalists for Colombia
Pan American Games medalists in archery
Central American and Caribbean Games medalists in archery
Medalists at the 2019 Pan American Games
20th-century Colombian women
21st-century Colombian women